Le Petit-Bornand-les-Glières, commonly referred to as Petit-Bornand, is a former commune in the Haute-Savoie department in the Auvergne-Rhône-Alpes region in south-eastern France. On 1 January 2019, it was merged with its neighbour village Entrement to form the new commune of Glières-Val-de-Borne.

Petit Bornand has a number of dairy farms, tourist accommodations and secondary residences. It is in the area which is authorised to produce the named soft cheese "roblochon"

People
Guillaume Fichet (1433-c. 1480) was born in this village.  With Johann Heynlin, Fichet set up the first printing press in France in 1470.

See also
Communes of the Haute-Savoie department

References

Former communes of Haute-Savoie
Populated places disestablished in 2019